Luo Longji (July 30, 1898 – December 7, 1965) was a Chinese politician and famous intellectual. Luo has been called the "China's number two rightist". He and Hu Shih collaborated to research and promote human rights in China, which made them one of the earliest prolific liberals in the People's Republic of China. Because he advocated for setting committees to rehabilitate the wronged people in previous Communist repressions, he was attacked by Wu Han during the Anti-Rightist Campaign and persecuted accordingly.

References
 Luo Longji

1898 births
1965 deaths
Academic staff of the National Southwestern Associated University
Victims of the Anti-Rightist Campaign
Chinese government officials
People from Ji'an
Alumni of the London School of Economics

Academic staff of Nankai University
Members of the China Democratic League
China Democratic Socialist Party politicians